The 2014 Copa América Femenina was the seventh edition of the Copa América Femenina, an association football competition for women's national teams in South America affiliated with CONMEBOL. The tournament was played between 11–28 September 2014 in Ecuador.

Qualification for other tournaments
Same as previous editions, the tournament served as CONMEBOL's qualifier for the FIFA Women's World Cup, the Pan American Games football tournament, and the Olympic football tournament, with the following qualifying rules:
For the 2015 FIFA Women's World Cup in Canada, the top two teams qualified directly, and the third-placed team advanced to a play-off against the fourth-placed team of the 2014 CONCACAF Women's Championship.
For the 2015 Pan American Games women's football tournament in Canada, the top four teams qualified.
For the 2016 Summer Olympics women's football tournament in Brazil, since Brazil already qualified automatically as hosts, the top-ranked team other than Brazil qualified. Since Brazil won the tournament, the runners-up Colombia joined Brazil as the two women's national teams from South America in the 2016 Olympics.

Host selection
Ecuador was confirmed as hosts in February 2014. Bolivia had also shown interest.

Teams
All ten CONMEBOL teams participated.

 (holders)

 (hosts)

Venues

Squads

Match officials

Ten referees and ten assistants were announced on 6 September 2014.

First stage
The draw was held on 22 May 2014. All times are ECT (UTC−5).

The teams were drawn into two groups of five teams and played a round-robin within their group from September 11 to 20. The top two teams from each group advanced to the final stage.

If teams finish level on points, order will be determined according to the following criteria:
 superior goal difference in all matches
 greater number of goals scored in all group matches
 better result in matches between tied teams
 drawing of lots

Group A

Group B

Final stage

The four teams played a round-robin from September 24 to 28. Brazil and Colombia advanced directly to the 2015 FIFA Women's World Cup, while Ecuador advanced to the intercontinental playoff against CONCACAF, which eventually Ecuador succeeded in qualifying. Colombia also qualified for the women's tournament at the 2016 Summer Olympics. All four teams also qualified for the women's tournament at the 2015 Pan American Games.

Awards

Top goalscorer:  Cristiane (6 goals)
Fair play award:

Qualified teams for Olympics
The following two teams from CONMEBOL qualified for the Olympic football tournament.

1 Bold indicates champion for that year. Italic indicates host for that year.

Statistics

Goalscorers
6 goals
 Cristiane

4 goals
 Rebeca Fernández

3 goals

 Mariana Larroquette
 Andressa Alves
 Maurine
 Francisca Lara
 Yoreli Rincón
 Giannina Lattanzio
 Jessica Martínez
 Lourdes Ortiz

2 goals

 Estefanía Banini
 Florencia Bonsegundo
 Fabiana Vallejos
 Janeth Morón
 Fabiana
 Formiga
 Raquel
 Dulce Quintana
 Pamela González
 Gabriela García

1 goal

 Micaela Cabrera
 Aldana Cometti
 Darlene
 Tamires
 Tayla
 Thaisa
 Fernanda Araya
 Carla Guerrero
 Daniela Zamora
 Lady Andrade
 Nataly Arias
 Tatiana Ariza
 Laura Cosme
 Isabella Echverria
 Melissa Ortiz
 Diana Ospina
 Leicy Santos
 Orianica Velasquez
 Adriana Barre
 Carina Caicedo
 Ingrid Rodríguez
 Erika Vázquez
 Ana Fleitas
 Verónica Riveros
 Emily Flores
 Yamila Badell
 Mariana Pion
 Lourdes Viana
 Yusmery Ascanio
 Daniuska Rodríguez

Final ranking

References

External links

Copa América Femenina, CONMEBOL.com 

 
2014
2014 in South American football
2015 FIFA Women's World Cup qualification
2014 in women's association football
Qualification tournaments for the 2015 Pan American Games
Football at the 2016 Summer Olympics – Women's qualification
September 2014 sports events in South America
2014 in Ecuadorian women's sport